The 1937–38 Sheffield Shield season was the 42nd season of the Sheffield Shield, the domestic first-class cricket competition of Australia. New South Wales won the championship.

Table

Statistics

Most Runs
Don Bradman 983

Most Wickets
Bill O'Reilly 33

References

Sheffield Shield
Sheffield Shield
Sheffield Shield seasons